Frederick Ngobi Gume, is a politician in Uganda. He is the State Minister for Cooperatives in the Ugandan Cabinet. He was appointed to that position on 6 June 2016. He concurrently serves as the elected member of parliament representing Bulamogi North West County, Kaliro District in the 10th Parliament (2016 - 2021). In 2021 he was elected to the same position.

See also
 Cabinet of Uganda
 Parliament of Uganda

References

External links
 Website of Parliament of Uganda

Living people
Kaliro District
National Resistance Movement politicians
Members of the Parliament of Uganda
Government ministers of Uganda
People from Eastern Region, Uganda
Year of birth missing (living people)
21st-century Ugandan politicians